James Corcoran (c. 1770–1804) was an Irish rebel.

James Corcoran may also refer to:

James Corcoran (sound engineer), American sound engineer
James A. Corcoran (Brooklyn) (c. 1880–1949), New York politician
James Andrew Corcoran (1820–1889), American Catholic publisher and theologian
Jim Corcoran (born 1949), Canadian musician
Jim Corcoran (politician) (1885–1965), Australian politician
Jimmy Corcoran (1820–1900), Irish-American gangster
King Corcoran (James Sean Patrick Corcoran, 1943–2009), American football player